In biology, paternal care is parental investment provided by a male to his own offspring. It is a complex social behaviour in vertebrates associated with animal mating systems, life history traits, and ecology. Paternal care may be provided in concert with the mother (biparental care) or, more rarely, by the male alone (so called exclusive paternal care).

The provision of care, by either males or females, is presumed to increase growth rates, quality, and/or survival of young, and hence ultimately increase the inclusive fitness of parents. In a variety of vertebrate species (e.g., about 80% of birds and about 6% of mammals), both males and females invest heavily in their offspring. Many of these biparental species are socially monogamous, so individuals remain with their mate for at least one breeding season.

Exclusive paternal care has evolved multiple times in a variety of organisms, including invertebrates, fishes, and amphibians.

Mammals 

Male mammals employ different behaviors to enhance their reproductive success (e.g. courtship displays, mate choice). However, the benefits of paternal care have rarely been studied in mammals, largely because only 5-10% of mammals exhibit such care (mostly present in primates, rodents and canids). In those species in which males provide extensive care for their offspring, indirect evidence suggests that its costs can be substantial. For example, mammalian fathers that care for their young may undergo changes in body mass and an increase in production of a number of costly hormones (e.g. androgens, glucocorticoids, leptin). Nonetheless, there is evidence that suggest that across all mammals, when males carry and groom their offspring their female partner fecundity increases, and if males provision the females, their litter size tend to be larger.

Humans 

Human cultures and societies vary widely in the expression of paternal care.  Some cultures recognize paternal care via celebration of Father's Day.  According to CARTA , human paternal care is a derived characteristic (evolved in humans or our recent ancestors) and one of the defining characteristics of Homo sapiens. Different aspects of human paternal care (direct, indirect, fostering social or moral development) may have evolved at different points in our history, and together they form a unique suite of behaviors as compared with the great apes.
One study of humans has found evidence suggesting a possible evolutionary trade-off between mating success and parenting involvement; specifically, fathers with smaller testes tend to be more involved in care of their children.

Research on the effects of paternal care on human happiness have yielded conflicting results.  However, one recent study concluded that fathers generally report higher levels of happiness, positive emotion, and meaning in life as compared with non-fathers.

According to the United States Census Bureau, approximately one third of children in the U.S. grow up without their biological father in their home.  Numerous studies have documented negative consequences of being raised in a home that lacks a father, including increased likelihood of living in poverty, having behavioral problems, committing crimes, spending time in prison, abusing drugs or alcohol, becoming obese, and dropping out of school.

Non-human primates 
In non-human primates, paternal investment is often dependent on the type of mating system exhibited by each species. Mating systems influence paternity certainty and the likelihood that a male is providing care towards his own biological offspring. Paternal certainty is high in monogamous pair-bonded species and males are less likely to be at risk for caring for unrelated offspring and not contributing to their own fitness. In contrast, polygamous primate societies create paternity uncertainty and males are more at risk of providing care for unrelated offspring and compromising their own fitness. Paternal care by male non-human primates motivated by biological paternity utilize past mating history and phenotypic matching in order to recognize their own offspring. Comparing male care efforts exhibited by the same species can provide insight on the significant relationship between paternity certainty and the amount of paternal care exhibited by a male. For example, Siamangs (Symphalangus syndactylus) utilize both polyandrous and monogamous mating systems but, it was found that monogamous males are more likely to carry infants and contribute to parental duties compared to those in promiscuous mating systems. Studies in Primatology have used primate mating systems and social organization to help theorize the evolutionary significance of paternal care in Primates.

Strepsirrhines 

Strepsirrhini is a suborder of the order Primates and includes lemurs, lorises, and bush babies. In this sub-order, males exhibit the lowest levels of paternal care for infants among primates. Examples of observed male care in this group include playing, grooming, and occasionally transporting infants. Males have also been observed interacting with infants while mothers park them and temporarily leave in order to feed. When female strepsirrhines park or nest their infants in nearby trees, males frequently use this as an opportunity to play with the unattended infants. In this suborder, male care and affection is directed toward multiple infants including non-biological offspring, and young strepsirrhines can be found interacting with various males. Paternal care does not influence infant growth rates or shorten inter-birth intervals of mothers as it can in haplorrhines. Strepsirrhini males exhibit the lowest intensity of care towards infants in non-human primates.

Strepsirrhines are constrained by their life history traits and reproductive rates are not flexible within this group of primates. This group of primates are programmed to give birth when food is abundant resulting in strict seasonal breeding periods. Shortening inter-birth intervals, which is theorized to be a possible outcome of increased male care, is not beneficial for Strepsirrhine mothers and can decrease infant survival. Studies also show that paternity can be highly skewed in Strepsirrhines, with only one or few male members being the only biological father within a single group. Instead of relying on a singular paternal figure, female mothers in this group rely on alloparenting from other group members. Infant parking and strict reproductive schedules are more beneficial for successful infant development in Strepsirrhines.

Haplorrhines 

Haplorhini, a sub-order of the order Primate, includes tarsiers, New World Monkeys, Old World monkeys, apes, and humans. Haplorrhini is broken into two sister groups which are commonly distinguished by the characteristic of the primate nose: Catarrhini (narrow turned down nose) and Platyrrhini (flat nose). Paternal care is highly variable between the two sister groups and the species within them.

Catarrhines 
Catarrhini is composed of Old World Monkeys (Cercopithecidae) and apes (Hylobatidae and Hominoidea). These primates are geographically located in Africa, Asia, and Madagascar.

Cercopithecines, the largest primate family, include primates species such as baboons, macaques, colobus, and vervet monkeys.

Apes consist of species of gibbons, siamangs, bonobos, chimpanzees, gorillas, orangutans and humans.

Catarrhines (non-human) are often organized into a multimale-multifemale social systems and utilize polygamous mating systems which results in paternity uncertainty. It is predicted that males in promiscuous mating systems do not engage in infant care due to the high costs of caring for an infant and missing opportunities to mate with receptive females. Male care in this group of primates is often portrayed through actions such as grooming, carrying, tolerance of the infant, as well as protection against agonistic interactions and infanticide. High ranking males can also provide access to food for developing infants. Direct care such as grooming and playing is not as common compared to male intervention on behalf of the infant when it is being harassed by conspecifics.

In Cercopiths, male involvement in the infant's interactions with others is common in many species of baboons but between species paternal care is not always biased towards biological offspring. Male Savannah baboons (Papio cynocephalus) direct care towards their own biological offspring. Males in this species are more likely to intervene and protect infants from harassment against other group members when the infant is predicted to be their own. Studies have shown that male Savannah baboons selectively choose to remain in closer proximity to their own offspring and engage in long-term investment beyond early infancy, when the infant is at greatest risk for infanticide. Infants receiving paternal investment in Savannah baboons have shown enhanced fitness and accelerated maturation through males creating a safe zone for infants to exist in. Similarly to Savannah Baboons, Yellow baboon (Papio cynocephalus) males provide elevated care for their own offspring. Long-term care and investment beyond early infancy is better linked to paternity in this species and affecting infant growth and development. Male baboons also direct care towards unrelated offspring based on male affiliations with female mothers. Baboon males and females within a social group often exhibit “friendships” with females which begin during birth of her infant and has been observed to end abruptly if the infant dies. Males establish associations with females in which they have previously mated resulting in affiliative behaviour and protection towards her offspring. Relationships created by male and female members are significant for infant survival in Chacma baboons (Papio ursinus) because the risk of infanticide in early infancy is higher in this species. Paternal care in the form of protection for the infant is therefore more beneficial than long term investment in Chacma baboons and is believed to be directed towards both biological and non-biological infants in the group.

Similarly to baboons, paternal roles and the underlying mechanisms as to why paternal care evolved vary within macaque species. In Sulawesi crested macaques (Macaca nigra) both male rank and the relationship to the mother predicted male care towards an infant instead of true biological paternity. In both Sulawesi and Barbary macaques (Macaca sylvanus) males adopted a “care-then-mate” strategy, in which care is provided to infants regardless of paternity in order for the male to increase future mating opportunities with the mother. In both species, it was observed that male macaques are more likely to initiate care towards and positively interact with the infant in the presence of the mother. In Assamese macaques (Macaca assamensis) biological paternity was the most significant predictor of male affiliations with infants and therefore males biased care towards infants presumed to be their own. Observers found that Assamese males were more likely to engage and provide care for infants in the absence of their mothers reducing the likelihood that care provided to infants will impress the mother and secure access to mating possibilities. In Rhesus macaques, male's providing protection and greater access to food resulted in higher weight gain for both male and female infants. This had a positive effect on infant survival and was significant in the first year of infancy when the risk of infanticide is the highest.

Chimpanzees (Pan troglodytes) are organized into fission-fusion social groups and provide an example of a polygamous mating society. Male chimpanzees often engage with infants in the form of grooming, playing, and providing protection towards other group members. In both Western and Eastern chimpanzees it was found that males were more likely to engage with their own biological offspring meaning that male care is directed by paternity in this species. In both chimpanzee and bonobo social groups, high ranking alpha males sire approximately half of the offspring within their social group. More research needs to be done addressing how reproductive skew affects paternal care and infant-male relationships in non-human primates including chimpanzees and bonobos.

Platyrrhines 

Platyrrhini is a sub-order of the order Primate and are commonly referred to as the New World Monkeys. These primates occupy Central and South America, and Mexico. This group is broken into five families, range in body size, and include species such as spider monkeys, capuchins, and howler monkeys.

Among primate species, the highest levels of male care found in New World monkeys are observed in Owl monkeys (Aotus azarai ) and Titi monkeys (Callicebus caligatus). In both of these species, males and females are monogamous, pair-bonded, and exhibit bi-parental care for their offspring. The social group in both these species consists of female and male parents along with their offspring. Males in these species serve as the primary caregivers and play a major role in infant survival.

Male Titi monkeys are more involved than the mother in all aspects of male care except nursing, and engage in more social activities such as grooming, food sharing, play, and transportation of the infant. The bond between an infant and its father is established right after birth and maintained into adolescence making the father the infant's predominant attachment figure. Similarly, the male Owl monkey acts as the main caregiver and is crucial to the survival of his offspring. If a female gives birth to twins, the male is still responsible for transporting both the infants. In the absence of a father, infant mortality increases in both these species and it is unlikely that the infant will survive. One study found that the replacement of a male enacting as the role of the father resulted in higher mortality during infancy emphasizing the importance of the social bond created between father and offspring at birth.

In White‐faced Capuchins (Cebus capucinus) one study found that parental care was exhibited in the form of playful behaviour, proximity to, inspection of, and collecting discarded food items from infants as determined by male rank and dominance status rather than biological relatedness to the infant. Scientists believe that future research on kin recognition needs to be done on capuchins to determine if males choose to bias their care as well as in other non-human primates relying on phenotypic matching to distinguish biological offspring.

Evolutionary Perspectives on Paternal Care in Primates 

The Theory of Paternal Investment: Differences in infant care between sexes stems from females investing more time and energy in their offspring than males, while males compete with one another for access to females. Although paternal care is rare among mammalians, males across many primate species still play a paternal role in infant care.

Hypotheses addressing the rise of paternal care in several primate species 
The Paternal Care hypothesis: Paternal care and investment will be designated to biological offspring, increasing the infant's chance of survival, and therefore increasing the male's own fitness. This hypothesis requires the on male to use recognition and behavioural cues to distinguish their own offspring from other infants. Paternal uncertainty is high in multimale-multifemale primate groups so males must use these cues to recognize and bias care towards their own offspring. This allows males to provide both short and long-term investment for infants. Primates living in monogamous pairs or single-male groups exhibit high paternity certainty and assist with the Paternal Care hypothesis.

The Mating Effort hypothesis:  Males provide care for infants in order to increase mating opportunities with females. This means that males are more likely to engage in affiliative behaviours with the infant in the presence of the mother as a form of male mating effort in order to enhance future reproductive success. This theory is independent of genetics and evolved independent of paternity.

The Maternal Relief hypothesis: Males provide care infants to help reduce reproductive burdens of the female, ultimately resulting shorter inter-birth intervals and more successful offspring. This stems from the male alleviating the female from her parental duties in order to keep her resources from becoming depleted and subsequently allowing her to produce high quality milk for the infant. Similarly to the mating effort hypothesis, the maternal relief hypothesis is independent of genetics and does not require the male to be the biological father to take part in infant care.

Rodents 

Several species of rodents have been studied as models of paternal care, including prairie voles (Microtus ochrogaster), Campbell's dwarf hamster, the Mongolian gerbil, and the African striped mouse.  The California mouse (Peromyscus californicus) is a monogamous rodent that exhibits extensive and essential paternal care, and hence has been studied as a model organism for this phenomenon.  One study of this species found that fathers had larger hindlimb muscles than did non-breeding males. Quantitative genetic analysis has identified several genomic regions that affect paternal care.

Birds 

Fathers contribute equally with mothers to the care of offspring in as many as 90% of bird species, sometimes including incubating the eggs.  Most paternal care is associated with biparental care in socially monogamous mating systems (about 81% of species), but in approximately 1% of species, fathers provide all care after eggs are laid.  The unusually high incidence of paternal care in birds compared to other vertebrate taxa is often assumed to stem from the extensive resource requirements for production of flight-capable offspring.  By contrast, in bats (the other extant flying vertebrate lineage), care of offspring is provided by females (although males may help guard pups in some species). In contrast to the large clutch sizes found in many bird species with biparental care, bats typically produce single offspring, which may be a limitation related to lack of male help. It has been suggested, though not without controversy, that paternal care is the ancestral form of parental care in birds.

Amphibians 
Paternal care occurs in a number of species of anuran amphibians, including glass frogs.

Fish 
According to the Encyclopedia of Fish Physiology: From Genome to Environment:

About 30% of the 500 known fish families show some form of parental care, and most often (78% of the time) care is provided by only one parent (usually the male).  Male care (50%) is much more common than female care (30%) with biparental care accounting for about 20%, although a more recent comparative analysis suggests that male care may be more common (84%).

There are three common theoretical explanations for the high levels of paternal care in fish, with the third one currently favoured.  First, external fertilization protects against paternity loss; however, sneaker tactics and strong sperm competition have evolved many times.  Second, the earlier release of eggs than sperm gives females an opportunity to flee; however, in many paternal care species, eggs and sperm are released simultaneously.  Third, if a male is already protecting a valuable spawning territory in order to attract females, defending young adds minimal parental investment, giving males a lower relative cost of parental care.

One well-known example of paternal care is in seahorses, where males brood the eggs in a brood pouch until they are ready to hatch.

Males from the Centrarchidae (sunfish) family exhibit paternal parental care of their eggs and fry through a variety of behaviors such as nest guarding and nest fanning (aerating eggs).

In jawfish, the female lays the eggs and the male then takes them in his mouth. A male can have up to 400 eggs in his mouth at one time. The male can't feed while he hosts the young, but as the young get older, they spend more time out of the mouth. This is sometimes termed mouthbrooding.

During the breeding season, male three-spined sticklebacks defend nesting territories. Males attract females to spawn in their nests and defend their breeding territory from intruders and predators. After spawning, the female leaves the male's territory and the male is solely responsible for the care of the eggs. During the ~6-day incubation period, the male 'fans' (oxygenates) the eggs, removes rotten eggs and debris, and defends the territory. Even after embryos hatch, father sticklebacks continue to tend their  newly hatched offspring for ~7 days, chasing and retrieving fry that stray from the nest and spitting them back into the nest.

Arthropods 

Paternal care is rare in arthropods, but occurs in some species, including the giant water bug and the arachnid Iporangaia pustulosa, a harvestman.  In several species of crustaceans, males provide care of offspring by building and defending burrows or other nest sites.  Exclusive paternal care, where males provide the sole investment after egg-laying, is the rarest form, and is known in only 13 taxa: giant water bugs, sea spiders, two genera of leaf-footed bugs, two genera of assassin bugs, three genera of phlaeothripid thrips, three genera of harvestmen, and in millipedes of the family Andrognathidae.

Theoretical models of the evolution of paternal care 

Mathematical models related to the prisoner's dilemma suggest that when female reproductive costs are higher than male reproductive costs, males cooperate with females even when they do not reciprocate. In this view, paternal care is an evolutionary achievement that compensates for the higher energy demands that reproduction typically involves for mothers.

Other models suggest that basic life-history differences between males and females are adequate to explain the evolutionary origins of maternal, paternal, and bi-parental care. Specifically, paternal care is more likely if male adult mortality is high, and maternal care is more likely to evolve if female adult mortality is high. Basic life-history differences between the sexes can also cause evolutionary transitions among different sex-specific patterns of parental care.

Consequences for offspring survival and development 

Care by fathers can have important consequences for survival and development of offspring in both humans and other species. Mechanisms underlying such effects may include protecting offspring from predators or environmental extremes (e.g., heat or cold), feeding them or, in some species, direct teaching of skills.  Moreover, some studies indicate a potential epigenetic germline inheritance of paternal effects.

The effects of paternal care on offspring can be studied in various ways. One way is to compare species that vary in the degree of paternal care. For example, an extended duration of paternal care occurs in the gentoo penguin, as compared with other Pygoscelis species. It was found that their fledging period, the time between a chick's first trip to sea and its absolute independence from the group, was longer than other penguins of the same genus. The authors hypothesized that this was because it allowed chicks to better develop their foraging skills before becoming completely independent from their parents. By doing so, a chick may have a higher chance of survival and increase the population's overall fitness.

Proximate mechanisms 

The proximate mechanisms of paternal care are not well understood for any organism.  In vertebrates, at the level of hormonal control, vasopressin apparently underlies the neurochemical basis of paternal care; prolactin and testosterone may also be involved.  As with other behaviors that affect Darwinian fitness, reward pathways in the brain may reinforce the expression of paternal care and may be involved in the formation of attachment bonds.

The mechanisms that underlie the onset of parental behaviors in female mammals have been characterized in a variety of species. In mammals, females undergo endocrine changes during gestation and lactation that "prime" mothers to respond maternally towards their offspring.

Paternal males do not undergo these same hormonal changes and so the proximate causes of the onset of parental behaviors must differ from those in females. There is little consensus regarding the processes by which mammalian males begin to express parental behaviors.  In humans, evidence ties oxytocin to sensitive care-giving in both women and men, and with affectionate infant contact in women and stimulatory infant contact in men.  In contrast, testosterone decreases in men who become involved fathers and testosterone may interfere with aspects of paternal care.

Placentophagia (the behavior of ingesting the afterbirth after parturition) has been proposed to have physiological consequences that could facilitate a male's responsiveness to offspring  Non-genomic transmission of paternal behavior from fathers to their sons has been reported to occur in laboratory studies of the biparental California mouse, but whether this involves (epigenetic) modifications or other mechanisms is not yet known.

See also

References

Further reading

External links 
 BBC Nature wildlife videos
  "Paternal Care" page at the Center for Academic Research and Training in Anthropogeny
 The Evolving Father by Peter B. Gray and Kermyt G. Anderson

Animal developmental biology
Evolutionary biology
Parenting